Akrini is a village and a community of the Kozani municipality. Before the 2011 local government reform it was part of the municipality of Ellispontos, of which it was a municipal district. The 2011 census recorded 960 inhabitants in the village and 975 inhabitants in the community of Akrini. The community of Akrini covers an area of 38.422 km2.

History
Neolithic era tools has been discovered near Akrini. Objects from the 2nd century BC has been found in the area, as well as an Early Christian church of the 4th century AD. The contemporary village of Akrini is inhabited by Greek refugees from Adapazarı.

Administrative division
The community of Polymylos consists of five separate settlements: 
Akrini (population 960)
Profitis Ilias (population 15)
The aforementioned population figures are as of 2011.

See also
List of settlements in the Kozani regional unit

References

Populated places in Kozani (regional unit)